Oxana Kiseleva (born 12 July 1988) is a Russian handball player for Rostov-Don.

References 
 

Russian female handball players
1988 births
Living people   
Sportspeople from Krasnodar
21st-century Russian women